Dysoxylum cyrtobotryum is a tree in the family Meliaceae. The specific epithet  is from the Greek meaning "curved fruits".

Description
The bark is brownish grey. The fragrant flowers are yellow, sometimes with a pinkish apex.

Distribution and habitat
Dysoxylum cyrtobotryum is found in the Andaman and Nicobar Islands, Indochina and Malesia. Its habitat is forests from sea-level to  altitude.

References

cyrtobotryum
Trees of Indo-China
Trees of Malesia
Plants described in 1861
Taxa named by Friedrich Anton Wilhelm Miquel